Caroline Wozniacki was the defending champion, but she chose not to participate.
Agnieszka Radwańska won the title, defeating Simona Halep 7–5, 6–0 in the final.

Seeds

Draw

Finals

Top half

Bottom half

Qualifying

Seeds

Qualifiers

Lucky losers
  Lesia Tsurenko
  Bojana Jovanovski

Qualifying draw

First qualifier

Second qualifier

Third qualifier

Fourth qualifier

References 
Main Draw
Qualifying Draw

2012 WTA Tour
2012 Singles